Shen Maomao (born 27 March 1957) is a Chinese former track and field athlete who competed in the javelin throw. His was a three-time Asian champion and is a former Asian record holder.

Career
This made him the first Chinese man to win that title, building on the success of his female counterpart Mao Jiajou in 1974. The following year he defeated Toshihiro Yamada in Tokyo by over eight metres to take the gold medal at the 1979 Asian Athletics Championships. Again this was a championship record and a first win for a Chinese athlete, and was also a new Asian record. Reflecting growing national prowess in the discipline, Li Xia also won the women's event that year.

China's 1980 Olympic boycott meant that Maomao did not get the opportunity to compete at the highest international stage. This throw would have been sufficient to earn him an Olympic medal at the 1980 Moscow Games. The mark was far in excess of his previous best and represented another Asian record for the Chinese thrower. A former Chinese national record, it remains the best mark ever set by a Chinese with the old javelin design. Among Asian athletes, only Kazakhstan's Viktor Yevsyukov (then competing for the Soviet Union) threw further.

Shen's last major competition was the 1981 Asian Athletics Championships and he successfully defended his title against Japanese opposition in Tokyo. This made him the first athlete to win that title twice. That year shot putter Mohammed Al-Zinkawi and Shigenobu Murofushi were also repeat throws champions.

His career best of 89.12 m in Philadelphia is also reported as being 89.14 m (perhaps due to the difference in converting imperial measurements). His highest global ranking came with this mark, at twelfth for the 1980 season.

International competitions

National titles
Chinese National Games
Javelin throw: 1979

References

Living people
1957 births
Chinese male javelin throwers
Asian Games gold medalists for China
Asian Games medalists in athletics (track and field)
Athletes (track and field) at the 1978 Asian Games
Medalists at the 1978 Asian Games
20th-century Chinese people